In Buddhism, transmission may refer to:

 Dharma transmission - the sequence of lineage holders of a tradition
 Esoteric transmission - the transmission of empowerment and authorization for a specific practice
 Empowerment (Vajrayana) - the transmission of empowerment and authorization for deity yoga
 Pointing-out instruction - the transmission of the knowledge of nature of mind